Erai river is a tributary of Wardha river and is an important river in Chandrapur district of Maharashtra.  The river originates near Kasarbodi village of Chimur taluka and meets Wardha river near Hadasti village. It has a total length of 78 km and lies entirely within Chandrapur district.

The river has a dam built on it that is called Erai Dam.  The dam provides water to Chandrapur city and to Chandrapur Super Thermal Power Station.  Zarpat river is a tributary of Erai river and meets it near Mana village.

References

Rivers of Maharashtra
Chandrapur district
Rivers of India